The Allegory of Love is a series of four paintings by Paolo Veronese, produced around 1570 as ceiling paintings. Some experts have established that they were commissioned by Rudolph II, Holy Roman Emperor (1552–1612) for Prague Castle. They are now part of the collection of the National Gallery in London.

Description

References

External links
 Infidelity on the National Gallery site
 Scorn on the National Gallery site
 Respect on the National Gallery site
 The Happy Union on the National Gallery site

Paintings by Paolo Veronese
Collections of the National Gallery, London
1570s paintings
16th-century allegorical paintings
Allegorical paintings by Italian artists
Paintings of Cupid
Dogs in art